Teenage Drug is the second album from Irish band The Sultans Of Ping FC.  It was released in March 1994, and reached #54 in the UK album chart.

Track listing 
 "Teenage Drug"
 "Wake Up & Scratch Me"
 "Teenage Punks"
 "Curse"
 "Michiko"
 "Love & Understanding"
 "Psychopath"
 "Terrorist Angel"
 "Teenrage Rock & Roll Girl"
 "Pussycat"
 "Sisters"
 "Pussycat" (Reprise)
 "Telephone Lover"
 "Red Cadillac and Black Moustache"

Personnel
 Niall O'Flaherty - vocals
 Pat O'Connell - guitar
 Alan McFeely - bass
 Morty McCarthy - drums

Chart positions

References

1994 albums
The Sultans of Ping FC albums